Green Emperor may refer to:

 The Green Emperor, a 1939 German film
 Anax gibbosulus, a species of dragonfly
 Cangdi, one of the five forms of the deity Wufang Shangdi
 Împăratul Verde, a character in the Romanian tale Harap-Alb

Animal common name disambiguation pages